Democratic Bharatiya Samaj Party (Democratic Indian Society Party) is a political party in Punjab, India. The Current party president is Rajinder Kumar Gill and founder of this party is Mr Vijay kumar hans who has died in 2019. In the Lok Sabha elections 2004 DBSP had put up two candidates, Vijay Kumar Hans from Jullundur (1,288 votes, 0.17%) and Parminder Singh Qaumi from Bhatinda (5,429 votes, 0,71%). In the Punjab assembly elections 2002 the party had put up nine candidates, who together got 3,189 votes. Vijay kumar Hans Died on 5th sep 2019 and After vijay kumar hans death Mr Rajinder Kumar Gill become national president of Democtaic Bhartia Samaj party on 14 Feb 2020.

References

Political parties in Punjab, India
Political parties with year of establishment missing